Alkalibacter is a Gram-positive, rod-shaped, strictly anaerobic and non-motile bacterial genus from the family of Carnobacteriaceae, with one known species (Alkalibacter saccharofermentans).

References

Further reading 
 
 

Lactobacillales
Monotypic bacteria genera
Bacteria genera